Mordella marginata is a species of Mordellidae that occurs in North America.

References

Beetles of North America
marginata
Beetles described in 1845
Taxa named by Frederick Ernst Melsheimer